Matthew Kieran (born 19 December 1968) is a British philosopher and was Professor of Philosophy and the Arts at the University of Leeds. He is known for his works on aesthetics.

Books
 Philosophical Aesthetics and the Sciences of Art. Royal Institute of Philosophy Supplements. Cambridge: Cambridge University Press
 Aesthetics and the Sciences of Mind. Oxford University Press
 Knowing Art: Essays in Aesthetics and Epistemology. Philosophical Studies Series. Springer
 Media and Values: Intimate Transgressions in a Changing Moral and Cultural Landscape. Intellect
 Contemporary Debates in Aesthetics and the Philosophy of Art. Contemporary Debates in Philosophy. Blackwell
 Revealing Art. Routledge
 Imagination, Philosophy and the Arts. Routledge
 Media Ethics. Routledge

References

External links

Faculty website

21st-century British philosophers
Philosophy academics
Living people
Philosophers of art
1968 births
Academics of the University of Leeds
Alumni of the University of St Andrews